High School Rapper  (Hangul: 고등래퍼) is a 2017 South Korean survival hip hop TV show. It aired on Mnet starting February 10, 2017 and was hosted by Jeong Jun-ha and Haha. In March, 2017, it was confirmed by Mnet that the show will have a second season.

Season overview

Mentors 
 YDG, Swings, Deepflow, Mad Clown,  Jessi, Seo Chul-gu & Giriboy

Preliminary round – events
From episode 1 to episode 3 preliminary round was on air. High school students from six areas participated in the preliminary round. Only ten students survived in each area.
 Controversy over participant's personality: There was controversy over personality from the first episode. Jang Yong-jun was at the center of the controversy. Jang Yong-jun got compliment from mentors for showing extraordinary rap skills, especially Swings at episode 1. However the next day, his improper behavior as a student (prostitution and drinking) was widely broadcast over the media. Also, being known that he is a son of politician Jang Jae-won, he resigned from the program.
 Middle school rapper Shin Yo-chan: Although Shin Yo-chan appeared at episode 3 for a short time, he is known to have made a strong impression. He suddenly appeared in the stage and said "I came here to see which rappers are running wild in this area." He age was only 15. He showed the audience funny rap and made many people laugh out loud. At last, he announced that he would participate in another rap competition program "Show me the Money 6" and many people are looking forward to advance of his rap skill.
 Participation of Kim Dong-hyun, Mark Lee: Participation of Kim Dong-hyun, Mark Lee drew much interest even before "High school Rapper" aired. Known as popular entertainers/idols rather than a rapper, people found it interesting to evaluate their rap skills under the same conditions of other rappers. Some people expected their ability to be overestimated because of their popularity. However, both of them survived from preliminary round.

Contestants

Color key

Cypher battle 
Right after preliminary round, cypher battle mission was given to some contestants. Contestants from each area competed with each student who received the same grade from other areas. Contestants who won first, third, sixth place should compete in cypher battles. Contestants should create lyrics on the spot and show his/her rap with the beat that mentors offer.
1st cypher: 
contestant: Kim Sun-jae, Yang Hong-won, Choi Ha-min, Kim Kyu-heon, Choi Seo-hyun, Jo Won-woo 
beat: Kid ink-Be real(), desiigner – panda()
winner: Choi Ha-min
3rd cypher:
contestant:Bang Jae-min, Park Hee-chan, Yoon Byung-ho, Oh Dam-ryul, Park Sung-gon, Lee Dong-min
beat: Fetty wap-679()
winner: Oh Dam-ryul (Chin Chilla)
6th cypher:
contestant: Johny, Mark Lee, Choi Suk-hyun, Kim Dong-hyun, Park Min, Sung Yong-hyun
beat: DJ Bob&Fabobeatz ft B-Will- Twerk 4 IT(), The Notorious B.I.G – Hypnotize()
winner: Choi Suk-hyun

1 vs 1 battle 
At high school rapper episode 7, 1 vs 1 battle was on air. 100 audience voted to the rapper and loser dropped out.

Final 
 Winner: Yang Hong-won (Young B)
 Runners-up:
 Choi Ha-min (Osshun Gum)
 Jo Won-woo (H2ADIN)
 Kim Sun-jae (SNZAE)
 Lee Dong-min (RAPTO/ICE PUFF)
 Kim Kyu-heon (HUNNYHUNNA)
 Mark Lee

Track listing

Regional competition

Final

Chart performance

Ratings

References

External links 
 (Korean) Official website 

Korean-language television shows
2017 South Korean television seasons